is a national university at Kariya, Aichi, Japan.

The history of the university dates back to 1873 when it was called Aichi Prefectural Training Institution. In 1949, the university had become known as the Aichi University of Arts and Science and by 1966 it got a title of what it is called today, Aichi University of Education. In 2004, the title got changed again, this time to the National University Corporation Aichi University of Education.

The school offers four education programs for undergraduate studies, as well as post graduate programs in the Graduate School of Educaction and Graduate School of Practitioners of Education.

In 2016, the university signed an exchange agreement with the Jogjakarta State University.

Notable alumni 

 Tsukumizu, mangaka and author of Girls' Last Tour

References

External links
Official website

Educational institutions established in 1873
1873 establishments in Japan
Japanese national universities
Universities and colleges in Aichi Prefecture
Educational institutions established in 1949
1949 establishments in Japan
Kariya, Aichi
Teachers colleges in Japan